Yannick Rowan Dinane (born 13 August 1998) is a Sint Maarten footballer who plays as a left midfielder for Sint Maarten club Soualiga.

Club career
In 2019, Dinane signed for Welsh third division side Dinas Powys.

References

External links
 

1998 births
Living people
Sint Maarten footballers
Association football midfielders
Flames United SC players
Dinas Powys F.C. players
FC Soualiga players
Sint Maarten expatriate footballers
Sint Maarten expatriate sportspeople in Wales
Expatriate footballers in Wales
Sint Maarten international footballers